The 16317 / 16318 Himsagar Express is a weekly Express train of the Indian Railways running between Kanyakumari in India's southernmost state of Tamil Nadu to Shri Mata Vaishno Devi Katra in Jammu and Kashmir- the northernmost state of India. It is currently the 36th longest running train service of world and  third-longest-running train on the Indian Railways in terms of distance and time, surpassed by the 15905/06 Dibrugarh-Kanyakumari Vivek Express and 12507/08 Aronai Superfast Express . In 72 hours, the train covers a distance of 3787 km at a speed of 52 km/h, and transverses twelve of India's states halting at a total of 73 stations.

History
Krishnagiri MP Dr. P. V. Periasamy's demand promoted national integration from Kanniyakumari to Kashmir through direct train service on 19-03-1979 in parliament.

Route
16317/18 Himsagar Express runs via following stations and states:

TAMIL NADU
  (Starts)
 
 Kulitturai
 
 
 
 
 
 

KERALA
 
 
 Kayamkulam
 
 
 
 
 
 
 Ottappalam
 

ANDHRA PRADESH
 
 
 
 
 
 
 
 

TELANGANA
 
 
 

MAHARASHTRA
 
 
 
 

MADHYA PRADESH
 
 
 

RAJASTHAN
 

UTTAR PRADESH
 
 
  Haryana

DELHI
 
 
 

HARYANA

 Bahadurgarh
 
 
 Narwana
 Tohana
 

PUNJAB
 Lehragaga
 Sunam
 Sangrur
 
 Malerkotla
 Ahmedgarh
 Kila Raipur
 
 
 
 
 Urmar Tanda
 Dasuya
 Mukerian
 

JAMMU KASHMIR
 Kathua
 Samba
 
 Udhampur
  (Ends)

Traction

Both trains are hauled by an Erode / Arakkonam-based WAP-4 electric locomotive from CAPE to SVDK.

Coach composition

The train has 19 coaches comprising one Second AC (2AC), two Third AC (3AC), ten Sleeper class (SL), three Unreserved coaches (UR/GS), two Luggage rakes (SLR) and one Pantry car (PC).

See also

Vivek Express
Bhopal Bharat Teerth Express
Navyug Express

Notes

References

External links
Himsagar Express Route

Transport in Kanyakumari
Transport in Katra, Jammu and Kashmir
Named passenger trains of India
Rail transport in Jammu and Kashmir
Rail transport in Haryana
Rail transport in Punjab, India
Rail transport in Delhi
Rail transport in Rajasthan
Rail transport in Madhya Pradesh
Rail transport in Maharashtra
Rail transport in Telangana
Rail transport in Andhra Pradesh
Rail transport in Tamil Nadu
Rail transport in Kerala
Express trains in India